Fedden is a surname. Notable people with the surname include: 

 Mary Fedden (1915–2012), British artist
 Robin Fedden (1908–1977), British writer, diplomat, and mountaineer
 Romilly Fedden (1875–1939), British artist
 Roy Fedden (1885–1973), British engineer

See also
 Fedder